Computers Unlimited, inc. (CUI) was a timesharing company headquartered in Rochester, NY. The company was founded before 1968 to offer consulting services and CP/CMS timesharing on an IBM 360/67 computer. The first president was Virgil M. Ross.

The company went public in 1969 with a market capitalization if $1.75 million. That year they had "major software development contracts" with Xerox Corporation, and a timesharing contract with the University of Rochester, and were also resellers for the Viatron System 21 display terminals, and the Miracl/CPG COBOL programming system.

Computers Unlimited declared bankruptcy in late 1970.

References

American companies established in 1967
American companies disestablished in 1970
Computer companies established in 1967
Computer companies disestablished in 1970
Defunct companies based in New York (state)
Defunct computer companies of the United States
Time-sharing companies